Josée Bélanger (born May 14, 1986) is a Canadian retired soccer player who played for Orlando Pride in the National Women's Soccer League and for the Canadian national team.

Club career
Bélanger signed with FC Rosengård in August 2015.

On February 8, 2016, it was announced that Bélanger would play for the Orlando Pride for the 2016 season of the National Women's Soccer League via the NWSL Player Allocation.

She retired in May 2017.

International career
She won a regional gold medal with Canada on two occasions, first at the 2004 CONCACAF Women's U-19 Championship and subsequently at the 2010 CONCACAF Women's Championship.

International statistics

International goals
Scores and results list Canada's goal tally first.

Honours
Canada

 Summer Olympic Games: Bronze Medal, 2016

References

External links
 

1986 births
Living people
People from Estrie
Canadian women's soccer players
Canada women's international soccer players
Soccer people from Quebec
French Quebecers
USL W-League (1995–2015) players
Expatriate women's footballers in Sweden
Damallsvenskan players
FC Rosengård players
2015 FIFA Women's World Cup players
Women's association football forwards
Orlando Pride players
National Women's Soccer League players
Expatriate women's soccer players in the United States
Canadian expatriate sportspeople in the United States
Footballers at the 2016 Summer Olympics
Olympic soccer players of Canada
Olympic bronze medalists for Canada
Olympic medalists in football
Medalists at the 2016 Summer Olympics
Pan American Games silver medalists for Canada
Footballers at the 2003 Pan American Games
Medalists at the 2003 Pan American Games
Pan American Games medalists in football
21st-century Canadian women
Laval Comets players